The  was a DC electric multiple unit (EMU) train type operated by the private railway operator Keisei Electric Railway on Skyliner limited express services to and from Narita International Airport in Japan. The "AE" stood for "Airport Express". First delivered in 1972, the trains operated between 1973 and 1993, and were replaced by Keisei AE100 series EMUs.

History
The new Skyliner services started on 21 May 1978, serving the original Narita Airport Station (present-day Higashi-Narita Station), and a further two six-car AE series sets were delivered in time for the start of these services. The sets were lengthened from six to eight cars from July 1990 ahead of the start of services to the new Narita Airport Station directly beneath the airport complex in March 1991. Lengthening the sets involved rebuilding some of the original driving cars as intermediate cars, forming a fleet of five eight-car sets from seven six-car sets, with two surplus cars being scrapped. The AE series sets were gradually phased out from June 1990 with the introduction of new AE100 series sets, and a final "sayonara" working ran on 27 June 1993.

Following the withdrawal of the fleet, the bogies and control equipment were re-used with new bodies to form a fleet of five eight-car 3400 series commuter EMUs.

Fire damage
Car AE29 (car 2) of set AE30 was scrapped due to fire damage sustained in an arson attack to depend on this Revolutionary Communist League, National Committee occurring on 5 May 1978.

Preserved examples
One car, AE61, is preserved at Sogo Depot in Shisui, Chiba Prefecture.

See also
 Narita Express

References

Keisei Electric Railway
Electric multiple units of Japan
Train-related introductions in 1973
1500 V DC multiple units of Japan
Nippon Sharyo multiple units
Tokyu Car multiple units